Bodmin Parkway railway station is on the Cornish Main Line that serves the nearby town of Bodmin and other parts of mid-Cornwall, England.

Great Western Railway manages the station and operates most of the train services, although CrossCountry operates some long-distance services. The Bodmin and Wenford Railway operates a heritage service on the branch to the town on certain days.

History

Bodmin was the most important town in Cornwall when the Cornwall Railway opened on 4 May 1859. Original proposals to build a branch to the town failed, as the company could not raise enough capital so, instead, they decided to open a station called "Bodmin Road" at a convenient point. As the agreement with Lord Vivian who owned the estate forbade the construction of a station in the estate, protracted negotiations were necessary before a new agreement could be reached. When the railway opened on 4 May 1859, all that could be reported was that: "No station has yet been erected for Bodmin, owing to the site not having been immediately determined upon. It will be either near to Glynn Bridge or "Respryn" Bridge and, until it is completed, the Bodmin traffic will be accommodated at a temporary wooden shed erected near the latter place." Respryn was near the entrance to Lanhydrock House, the home of Mr Robartes, a railway supporter.

The new station was finally ready to open on 27 June 1859 and was named "Bodmin Road". Because of its remote location, the station master was paid five pounds by the Post Office to carry out the duties of postmaster. He also received a special lodging allowance until a house could be provided for him two years later. A goods shed was built in 1860 at the east end of the station, behind the platform for trains to Plymouth, and cattle pens were added the following year. A footbridge across the line was built by Mr Robartes in 1860 to enable visitors to reach Lanhydrock more easily. This was later replaced by a passage beneath the tracks. This path is still used by those visitors to this National Trust property who arrive by train.

In 1863 a Bodmin, Wadebridge and Cornwall Junction Railway was proposed to connect the Cornwall Railway at Bodmin Road with the Bodmin and Wadebridge Railway at Bodmin, an isolated standard gauge line owned by the London and South Western Railway. In 1864, an agreement was reached with the Cornwall Railway to work the line once it was completed, and an Act of Parliament was obtained. Capital proved difficult to raise and so the scheme failed. The line was eventually built by the Great Western Railway, opening on 27 May 1887; this meant that the goods shed had to be moved to the opposite end of the station to make room for the branch platform. This was a standard gauge line and so traffic from Bodmin to the Cornwall Railway had to be transferred at Bodmin Road until the broad gauge line was converted over the weekend of 21 May 1892.

The Cornwall Railway was originally a single track  broad gauge line, but a passing loop was situated at Bodmin Road to allow trains to pass. It was amalgamated into the Great Western Railway on 1 July 1889.

Both of the 3521 class 0-4-4-T locomotives left the rails on a curve and dragged nearly the whole of the train with them. The lead engine slewed across both lines at right angles to the train, the train engine rolling over into a field beside the line. Despite the train running headlong into the now stationary engine, there were no fatalities. It is thought that the track had been damaged by the preceding train, also headed by 3521 class engines. These engines had a reputation for rough riding, particularly at speed, and according to the official accident report, the preceding train had almost certainly been speeding through the section based on the timings taken at Doublebois and Bodmin Road. This very likely damaged the track and led to the derailment of the following train. Following another derailment involving a 3521 class engine at Hill Head between Falmouth and Penryn which killed the driver, 3521 class locomotives were subsequently banned from working in pairs and were taken off fast trains until rebuilt as 4-4-0 tender locomotives.

The Great Western Railway was nationalised into British Railways from 1 January 1948. Goods facilities at Bodmin Road were withdrawn on 4 November 1963.

In 1969 St Merryn contractors R C Wilce and Sons demolished most of the station buildings and replaced them with modern timber structures at a cost of £8,000. Bodmin Road was renamed 'Bodmin Parkway' on 4 November 1983 and in 1989 the wooden station buildings were replaced by brick structures. In 2002/2003 a £500,000 Rail Passenger Partnership scheme saw the car park being extensively improved and the ticket office block extended.

Heritage Railway 
The line to Bodmin General lost its passenger service on 30 January 1967, although goods traffic (primarily china clay) continued on the branch line until 20 November 1983. After this ceased the line was taken over by the Bodmin and Wenford Railway and reopened as a heritage railway on 17 June 1990. There is no booking office for the Bodmin and Wenford trains so passengers buy their tickets from the guard. These trains use the opposite face of the platform used by mainline trains towards Plymouth. The Bodmin line curves sharply away to the north at the west end of the platform, and between this line and the main line is the exchange siding used for occasional movements between the two railways, and a large modern carriage shed alongside that is used to store rolling stock for the Bodmin and Wenford Railway.

Stationmasters

Richard Francis 1859–1862
Richard Lean 1862–1873 (later Mayor of Truro)
Charles Courtenay Hocking 1873 (appointed but then declined)
Daniel Bailey 1873–1886
J.R. Martin 1886–1896 (afterwards station master at )
Mr Crisp 1896–1901 (afterwards station master at )
Edwin Charles Kent 1901 – ca. 1914 
J.J. Beard ca. 1924–1933
C.J. Mahoney 1938–1955
Leslie Arthur Shelley Feb 1955 – c. Jan 1965 (when the post was subsumed into the duties of an Area Manager who covered Wadebridge, Bodmin General and Bodmin Road)

Facilities

The entrance to the station is on the south-east side of the line, and so the approach road from the road to Bodmin passes under the line north of the platforms. A footpath leads from the car park to Lanhydrock House, passing under the line at the west end of the station.

The brick-built Great Western Railway booking office is next to the entrance on the westbound platform, while a matching building on the opposite platform serves as a waiting room for passengers travelling towards Plymouth. The old signal box, now used as a cafe, is situated to the north-east of the booking office and the footbridge is situated beyond this. The signal box is a Type 3 Great Western Railway structure dating from 1887 with stairs in two different styles. It was designated as a Grade II listed building in 2015.

Signalling

When the Cornwall Railway opened, its trains were controlled by independently operated signals; there were no signal boxes but an electric telegraph linked the stations so that the policemen who controlled the dispatch of the trains could communicate. It is unclear when a signal box was first provided at Bodmin Road, but the surviving structure is reported to have been brought into use either in 1893 with the doubling of the line, or even as late as 1897.

The signal box was fitted with a new locking frame in 1912 and was rebuilt circa 1928. The next signal box to the east was at Largin, and to the west was at Lostwithiel. A new signal box was opened on 31 January 1931 at Onslow Sidings (to serve a china clay works),  towards Largin, but closed again on 10 November 1968. The signal box at Bodmin Road was itself closed on 30 May 1985, as was that at Largin on 14 December 1991.

The single track of the Bodmin branch was controlled by an electric train staff until 28 December 1950, after which an electric key token was used. Signalling on the branch was removed on 27 March 1968, after which points were operated by independent levers. The connection from the main line into the exchange siding is operated by a lever frame under the supervision of Lostwithiel signal box.

Services

On summer weekends some CrossCountry trains serve Newquay.

Connections 
The bus link to Bodmin, Wadebridge and Padstow starts from outside the main entrance. Plymouth Citybus operates a bus service (to Bodmin and Padstow in one direction and Liskeard in the other) from the small station car park.

References

Railway stations in Cornwall
Former Great Western Railway stations
Railway stations in Great Britain opened in 1859
Heritage railway stations in Cornwall
Railway stations served by CrossCountry
Railway stations served by Great Western Railway
Bodmin and Wenford Railway
Bodmin
1859 establishments in England
DfT Category D stations